Vera Cruz Futebol Clube, commonly known as Vera Cruz, is a Brazilian football club based in Vitória de Santo Antão, Pernambuco state. They competed in the Série C once.

History
The club was founded on 3 February 1960. Vera Cruz won the Campeonato Pernambucano Third Level in 2002, and the Campeonato Pernambucano Second Level in 2006 and in 2009. They competed in the Série C in 2007, when they were eliminated in the First Stage of the competition.

Achievements

 Campeonato Pernambucano Second Level:
 Winners (1): 2006, 2009
 Campeonato Pernambucano Third Level:
 Winners (1): 2002

Stadium
Vera Cruz Futebol Clube play their home games at Estádio Municipal Severino Cândido Carneiro, nicknamed Carneirão. The stadium has a maximum capacity of 8,000 people.

References

Football clubs in Pernambuco
Association football clubs established in 1960
1960 establishments in Brazil